Chaf-e Pain (also Romanized as Chāf-e Pā’īn; also known as Chāf and Pā’īn Chāf) was a village in Chaf Rural District, in the Central District of Langarud County, Gilan Province, Iran. At the 2006 census, its population was 2,909, in 866 families.  
It was merged into the city of Chaf and Chamkhaleh.

References 

Populated places in Langarud County
Former populated places in Gilan Province